Syspastospora parasitica is a mycoparasitic fungus. It attacks other fungi, particularly species of Beauveria and Isaria (molds that belong to the family Clavicipitaceae). It parasitizes the mycelium of its host by means of specialized contact cells, and produces dark brown, long-necked perithecia.

References

Fungi described in 1857
Parasitic fungi
Hypocreaceae
Taxa named by Edmond Tulasne